Once a Thief is a remake of a 1991 film of the same name. Both films were directed by John Woo. The film was also made into a 1997 television series also of the same name. The remake aired on the Fox Network and was hoped to be the beginning of a weekly series, but Fox passed on it, and the series aired instead on the CTV Television Network in Canada.

Plot
The film is about two orphans - Mac Ramsey and Li Ann Tsei who have spent their life living with the Tang family - a ruthless Chinese organized crime syndicate. Mac and Li Ann were taken in by the Tang Godfather and have formed a close friendship with his son Michael.

When they grow up, Li Ann is betrothed to Michael, but falls in love with Mac so the two scheme to steal money from the Tang family and run off to start a new life. During the heist, Mac is arrested and Li Ann flees to Canada. 18 months later, Mac is released into the charge of a menacing woman known only as the Director who takes him to Canada to work for her crime-fighting team. He soon realizes he will be working with Li Ann and her former cop boyfriend Victor.

Cast
 Sandrine Holt as Li Ann Tsei
 Ivan Sergei as Mac Ramsey
 Nicholas Lea as Victor Mansfield
 Robert Ito as The Godfather
 Michael Wong as Michael Tang
 Alan Scarfe as Robertson Graves
 Jennifer Dale as The Director
 Nathaniel DeVeaux as Dobrinsky
 Greg Chan as Dance MC
 Young Ryu as Li Ann's Dance Partner
 Matthew Walker as Interpol Judge
 Paul Wu as Judge's Aide
 Phillip Tsui as Fong
 Derek Lowe as Mill Security Guard

TV series

The spin-off series ran for one season.

See also
 Once a Thief (1991 film)
 Once a Thief (TV series)

External links
 
 
 

1996 television films
1996 films
Canadian drama television films
Canadian action films
1990s crime action films
Canadian crime drama films
1996 crime drama films
Films directed by John Woo
Films about orphans
Films adapted into television shows
Remakes of Hong Kong films
Crime television films
Action television films
1990s English-language films
1990s Canadian films